"Because I Want You" is a song by English alternative rock band Placebo, released as the first UK single from their 2006 album Meds – in territories outside the UK, the single was substituted by "Song to Say Goodbye".

Release 

In the UK, it peaked at number 13 in the UK Singles Chart, staying in the charts for three weeks. It was the band's final top 20 hit to date. The song was also the first Placebo single to be given a download release with a track unavailable on the various physical releases.

Track listing

References

External links
 

2006 singles
Placebo (band) songs
Songs written by Brian Molko
Songs written by Stefan Olsdal
2006 songs
Virgin Records singles
Songs written by Steve Hewitt